Zoya Nikolayevna Rozhdestvenskaya (16 August 1906 — 8 November 1953) was a Soviet singer, a holder of the title of Meritorious Artist of the RSFSR. She was the original performer of the song "Moya Moskva" ("My Moscow") that many years later became the hymn of Moscow. (She was the one who sang on the first recording of the song.)

References

External links 
 

1906 births
1953 deaths
Soviet women singers
Honored Artists of the RSFSR
Burials at Bogoslovskoe Cemetery